The Portage Lakes Hockey Club was one of the first professional ice hockey clubs. Based in Houghton, Michigan, the club played at the Amphidrome from 1904 until 1906. While members of the International Professional Hockey League, the team won the league championship twice. A second coming of the team is playing in the Great Lakes Hockey League.

Players
Among the players on the team were:
 George Cochrane
 Joe Hall
 Riley Hern
 Barney Holden
 Fred Lake
 Bruce Stuart
 Cyclone Taylor

See also
International Professional Hockey League

References

External links

 
Defunct ice hockey teams in the United States
Houghton County, Michigan
Professional ice hockey teams in Michigan
Ice hockey clubs established in 1904
Sports clubs disestablished in 1907
1904 establishments in Michigan
1907 disestablishments in Michigan